PS Banyuasin or Persatuan Sepakbola Banyuasin (en: Football Association of Banyuasin) is an Indonesian football club based in Banyuasin Regency, South Sumatra. The club currently played in Liga 3.

References

External links
PS Banyuasin Liga-Indonesia.co.id
PS Banyuasin Instagram

Football clubs in Indonesia
Football clubs in South Sumatra